Death angel may refer to:

 Death-angel, common name for the herb Justicia pectoralis
 Amanita ocreata, a poisonous mushroom
 Death Angel, a thrash metal band from Concord, California
 Death Angels, a Nation of Islam splinter group involved in the Zebra murders
 B-9 Death Angel, a 1930s United States Army Air Corps bomber aircraft
 Death Angels, nickname of United States Marine Corps squadron VMFA-235
 Nemesis 4: Death Angel, a 1996 American science fiction film
 Death Angel, a novel by Linda Fairstein
 Death's Angels, a novel by William King

See also
 Angel of Death (disambiguation)
 Death (personification)
 Destroying angel (disambiguation)